I, Lucifer is the second studio release from Destroy the Runner. It is the first Destroy the Runner album released with vocalist Chad Ackerman, replacing Kyle Setter; and Tanner Sparks, replacing Jeremiah Crespo on bass. This record takes on a far more progressive sound from their previous effort. I, Lucifer was released on April 15, 2008. The day of the release they also played a short set for free at Lou's Records in Encinitas, California.

The album was recorded with Brian McTernan at Salad Days Studio. I, Lucifer shows the band drifting away from their metalcore sound established in their debut, Saints, as it features less screaming and more singing.

Track listing

Personnel
Chad Ackerman – lead vocals
Nick “Maldy" Maldonado – lead guitar
Duane Reed – rhythm guitar, vocals
Tanner Sparks – bass guitar
Marc Kohlbry – drums

References

2008 albums
Solid State Records albums
Destroy the Runner albums
Albums produced by Brian McTernan